95th meridian may refer to:

95th meridian east, a line of longitude east of the Greenwich Meridian
95th meridian west, a line of longitude west of the Greenwich Meridian